Kahur Deraz may refer to:
 Kahur Deraz, Faryab
 Kahur Deraz, Qaleh Ganj